The 2006 Hazfi Cup Final was a two-legged football tie in order to determine the 2005–06 Hazfi Cup champion of Iranian football clubs. Persepolis faced Sepahan in this final game. The first leg took place on September 13, 2006 at 17:40 local time (UTC+3:30) at Azadi Stadium in Tehran and the second leg took place on September 22, 2006 at 15:00 local time (UTC+3:30) at Naghsh Jahan Stadium, Esfahan.

Format 
The rules for the final were exactly the same as the one in the previous knockout rounds. The tie was contested over two legs with away goals deciding the winner if the two teams were level on goals after the second leg. If the teams could still not be separated at that stage, then extra time would have been played with a penalty shootout (taking place if the teams were still level after extra time).

Route to the final

Final Summary

First Leg

Second Leg

Champions

See also 
 2005–06 Iran Pro League
 2005–06 Azadegan League
 2005–06 Iran Football's 2nd Division
 2005–06 Iran Football's 3rd Division
 2005–06 Hazfi Cup
 2005–06 Iranian Futsal Super League
 Iranian Super Cup

2006
2005–06 in Iranian football
Persepolis F.C. matches
Sepahan S.C. matches